William Henry Kelly (1 December 187727 January 1960) was an Australian  politician. He served in the House of Representatives from 1903 to 1919, and served as an honorary minister under Prime Minister Joseph Cook from 1913 to 1914.

Early life
Kelly was born in Sydney and educated at All Saints College, Bathurst, and Eton College from 1893 to 1896.  He married Olive Miller (better-known under the stage name of Olive Morrell) in London in January 1908.

Politics
In 1903 Kelly was elected to the seat of Wentworth in the Australian House of Representatives, representing the Free Trade Party.

In parliament, Kelly was known for his habit of smoking cigars in the chamber, although he was eventually asked to stop by the speaker Frederick Holder. This combined with his Etonian manners meant he was held in little regard by the Australian Labor Party (ALP). Billy Hughes once said that he had "as much idea of the work of the world as a butterfly has of casting an 81-ton gun". In May 1909, at the instigation of Alfred Deakin, Kelly moved the motion to adjourn that ended ALP leader Andrew Fisher's first term as prime minister.

From June 1913 to September 1914, Kelly was an honorary minister in the Cook Ministry.  He reversed King O'Malley's decision to build Walter Burley Griffin's plan for Canberra using the departmental plan and instead appointed Griffin as Federal capital director of design and construction.  He also negotiated a plan for standardisation of Australia's rail gauge, but this was scrapped when the Fisher government came to power in September 1914.  He was in opposition until the formation of the Nationalist Government in February 1917.  He did not get a ministry in the Hughes government and retired at the 1919 election.

Later life
Kelly separated from his wife, who took their daughter Mary Wentworth Kelly back to England.  He  died at the Royal Prince Alfred Hospital in the Sydney suburb of Camperdown, aged eighty-two. He was the last surviving member of Joseph Cook's Cabinet, as well as the last surviving MP who served during Alfred Deakin's three tenures as Prime Minister, as well as during the Prime Ministerships of Chris Watson, George Reid and Andrew Fisher's first tenure.

His younger brother was the composer and oarsman Frederick Septimus Kelly.

Notes

Free Trade Party members of the Parliament of Australia
Nationalist Party of Australia members of the Parliament of Australia
Members of the Australian House of Representatives for Wentworth
People educated at Eton College
1877 births
1960 deaths
Commonwealth Liberal Party members of the Parliament of Australia
20th-century Australian politicians